Zangskari (Zanskari, Zaskari) is an endangered Tibetic language. It is mostly spoken in Zanskar in Union Territory of Ladakh, India, and also by Buddhists in the upper reaches of Lahaul, Himachal Pradesh, and Paddar, Jammu and Kashmir. It is written using the Tibetan script.

Zangskari is divided into four homogeneous groups, namely Oot (Stod) or Upper Zanskari spoken along the Doda River, Zhung (Gžun) or Central Zanskari mostly spoken in Padum valley, Sham (Gšam) or Lower Zanskari spoken along the lower portions of Zanskar River and lastly Lungnak (Luŋnag) along the upper Zanskar River region.

References

Further reading

External links
Endangered Languages Project Profile for Zangskari

Linguistic Map of Zangskari

Endangered languages of India
Languages of Ladakh
Kargil district
Languages written in Tibetan script
Bodic languages
Culture of Ladakh
Ladakh